Dioryctria albovittella, the pinyon tip moth, is a species of moth of the family Pyralidae. It is found in North America including New Mexico.

The wingspan is about 25 mm. Adults are greyish. The forewings are marked in a zig-zag pattern. The hindwings are greyish white. Adult are on wing from late June to August in one generation per year.

The larvae feed on pinyon pine. They feed underneath the bark of twig terminals, producing girdling wounds that cause twig dieback. Often there is some oozing of pitch at the wound site. Larvae may also tunnel cones. Older larvae are light golden brown with a dark brown head. The species overwinters in the first instar larval stage within a silk cocoon on the bark. Pupation takes place in the terminals and cones.

Gallery

References

Moths described in 1900
albovittella